Estadio de la Unidad Deportiva Mario Villanueva Madrid is a stadium in Playa del Carmen, Mexico.  It is primarily used for soccer, and is the home field of the Inter Playa del Carmen soccer team in Mexico's third division.  It holds 7,500 people and features a natural grass surface.

The stadium was to host all Group B matches for the 2010 CONCACAF Women's Gold Cup, but a last-minute change moved those games to the Estadio Quintana Roo in Cancún.

References

Sports venues in Quintana Roo